Begum Akhtar Jahan (born 1 July 1952) is a Bangladesh Awami League politician. She served as Jatiya Sangsad member representing the Reserved Women's Seat - 5. In 2019, she was awarded Begum Rokeya Padak by the Government of Bangladesh.

References

Living people
1952 births
People from Rajshahi District
Awami League politicians
Women members of the Jatiya Sangsad
10th Jatiya Sangsad members
Recipients of Begum Rokeya Padak
21st-century Bangladeshi women politicians